Santos Saúl "Canelo" Álvarez Barragán (born 18 July 1990) is a Mexican professional boxer. He has won multiple world championships in four weight classes from light middleweight to light heavyweight, including unified titles in three of those weight classes and lineal titles in two. Álvarez is the first and only boxer in history to become undisputed champion at super middleweight, having held the WBA (Super), WBC and Ring magazine titles since 2020, and the IBF and WBO titles since 2021.

Álvarez is known as an excellent counterpuncher, being able to exploit openings in his opponents' guards while avoiding punches with head and body movement. He is also known as a formidable body puncher. As of May 2022, Álvarez is ranked as the world's best active boxer, pound for pound, by BoxRec and the Boxing Writers Association of America; fourth by ESPN; fifth by the TBRB; and sixth by The Ring. He is also ranked as the world's best active super middleweight by BoxRec, The Ring, TBRB, and ESPN.

Early life
In an interview, Álvarez explained that he was born on the outskirts of Guadalajara, Jalisco, but his family is originally from Los Reyes, Michoacán. At the age of five, his family moved to their current home of Juanacatlán, Jalisco. Growing up on his family's farm, he learned horseback riding, which he continues today. Álvarez is the youngest of eight children, seven of them boys; all of his brothers also became professional boxers. Among his brothers are welterweight boxers Ramón Álvarez, Ricardo Álvarez and former WBA interim world champion, Rigoberto Álvarez.

Canelo in Spanish is the masculine word for cinnamon, which is a common nickname for people with red hair. His mother, Ana Maria, also has red hair. In Mexico, it is common for people to associate red hair with the Irish soldiers who fought for Mexico in the Saint Patrick's Battalion during the Mexican–American War. Speaking about his ancestry, Álvarez once said, "There might have been an Irish grandfather somewhere back in my past."
He was bullied at an early age when he would be called "Jícama con Chile", which translates as jicama with chilli flakes – a popular snack in Mexico.

Amateur career
Álvarez started boxing when he was around 13 years old, after watching his older brother Rigoberto debut as a professional boxer. In 2004, he won the silver medal at the Junior Mexican National Championships, held in Sinaloa. He became the 2005 Junior Mexican National Boxing Champion in Tuxtla Gutiérrez, Chiapas, at the age of 15. His amateur record was 44–2 with 12 knockouts.

Professional career

Early years
Álvarez turned professional at 15, shortly after his championship at the Junior Nationals, because his trainers at the time, father-and-son team Chepo and Eddy Reynoso, were unable to find suitable junior opponents for him. In his first 19 months as a professional, he knocked out eleven of his 13 documented opponents, all of whom were significantly older. However, the elder Reynoso stated in 2013 that Álvarez had fought ten more times in that span, winning all ten by knockout (KO), but that these fights (all in small venues in the Mexican state of Nayarit) were so poorly documented that it was not worth the trouble to seek to have the record corrected. This means that his actual record is 67–2–2 with 49 knockouts. His weight fluctuated in his three years as a professional including two documented fights within the light welterweight limit of 140 lbs before he settled in the welterweight division at 147 lbs.

Álvarez's third official bout of his career was a win over future IBF lightweight champion Miguel Vázquez on 20 January 2006, in his home town of Guadalajara, Jalisco. On 28 June 2008, Álvarez defeated Vázquez again in a rematch. He also made world history on that fight card when he and all six of his brothers fought on the same night, with Canelo being the youngest. The only downside was that three of them failed to win their pro debuts. The other four more experienced brothers won. On 6 March 2010, he got a crushing third-round KO over Brian Camechis in Tuxtla Gutiérrez, Chiapas. Álvarez then defeated José Cotto on the undercard of Floyd Mayweather Jr. vs. Shane Mosley to retain his WBC-NABF welterweight title.

Light middleweight
His sixth-round technical knockout (TKO) win over Luciano Leonel Cuello for the WBC Silver light middleweight title was held at the Vicente Fernández Arena. During the post-fight interview, Mexican singer Vicente Fernández gave Álvarez a horse. He was also given a horse by the mayor of Tepic, where Álvarez sometimes trains.

He next faced the former WBC welterweight champion Carlos Baldomir at the Staples Center in Los Angeles, California, on the Shane Mosley vs. Sergio Mora undercard. Baldomir stated in a pre-fight interview that he wanted the winner of Mora vs. Mosley, as he said "after I knock out El Canelo." Baldomir weighed in at 153.4 lbs for the bout, that was contracted for 151 lbs. In California, if a fighter is overweight he is penalized 20% of his purse and that percent is given to the other fighter. However, Álvarez declined to take the extra $12,000 from Baldomir. In the sixth round, Álvarez landed a crushing blow that knocked Baldomir out cold. With the victory, Álvarez became just the second boxer ever to stop Carlos Baldomir and the first boxer ever to knock him out. Álvarez then successfully defended his light middleweight title by unanimous decision against former world champion Lovemore N'dou in Veracruz. It was a competitive fight despite the wide margins on the official scorecards of 119–109, 120–108, and 120–108.

Álvarez was in line as mandatory challenger for the winner of the vacant WBC light middleweight title bout between Manny Pacquiao and Antonio Margarito, however, Pacquiao who was the victor, wrote to the WBC stating he had no intention of defending the title and it was declared vacant. On 5 March 2011, Álvarez defeated European welterweight champion Matthew Hatton via unanimous decision, for the vacant WBC light middleweight belt. The bout was televised on HBO and took place at the Honda Center in Anaheim, California. Álvarez was docked a point in the seventh round, which was uniformly scored 9–9, for hitting after the break. All three ringside judges scored the bout 119–108 in favor of Álvarez, who landed 47% of his 626 punches, including 53% of his power shots. Hatton connected with just 25% of his 546 total blows in a fight that averaged 1.4 million viewers on HBO.

Álvarez successfully defended his newly awarded WBC title against #4 ranked Ring light middleweight and current European light middleweight champion Ryan Rhodes. Álvarez defeated Rhodes via TKO in the twelfth round on 18 June 2011, in Guadalajara, Jalisco. The fight averaged 1.6 million viewers on HBO.

On 17 September 2011, Álvarez successfully defended that same WBC title against The Contender competitor Alfonso Gómez at the Staples Center in Los Angeles, winning via TKO in the sixth round. Gómez won a majority of the first five rounds after Álvarez knocked him down in the first round. Álvarez was looking for one shot and got it in the sixth round when he backed Gómez up with a right hand. He then followed up with a flurry to get the referee to jump in and stop the fight.

Álvarez vs. Cintrón

Álvarez defeated Kermit Cintrón via TKO in the fifth round. Álvarez spent the first three rounds feeling out his opponent Cintrón, a former welterweight champion, before punishing the Puerto Rican with body shots and straight right hands in the fourth round. He knocked Cintrón down once and had him in trouble at the end of the round, but Cintrón was saved by the bell. In the fifth round, Cintrón came out and caught Álvarez with some combinations, but Álvarez eventually overpowered him with several powerful straight right hands and the referee stepped in and stopped it. The fight averaged 1.5 million viewers on HBO: Boxing After Dark.

Álvarez vs. Mosley
Richard Schaefer announced that Álvarez's next bout would co-feature on the undercard of Miguel Cotto's clash with Floyd Mayweather Jr. at the MGM Grand Garden Arena. On 11 February 2012, Shane Mosley was announced as Álvarez's next opponent in May for his WBC light middleweight title. Álvarez defeated Mosley via unanimous decision after twelve rounds.

Álvarez vs. López
Álvarez was originally set to fight top ten Ring light middleweight and former welterweight champion Paul Williams on 15 September 2012. However, on 27 May 2012, a motorcycle accident in the U.S. state of Georgia paralyzed Williams from the waist down, ending his boxing career. Álvarez's possible opponents for his September bout were James Kirkland, Austin Trout, Delvin Rodriguez and most notably, Victor Ortiz.

Álvarez was scheduled to defend his title against former welterweight titlist Victor Ortiz in the main event of a Showtime pay-per-view (PPV) card dubbed 'Knockout Kings' at the MGM Grand Garden Arena. However, on 23 June, Ortiz was unable to defeat underdog Josesito López in what was supposed to be a "tune-up" fight at the Staples Center in Los Angeles, losing due to referee stoppage (broken jaw) and cancelling his bout with Álvarez as a result.

Due to this upset, López was instead penciled in to face Canelo at the MGM Grand on 15 September, for Álvarez's WBC light middleweight title. Álvarez won the fight via fifth-round TKO after dominating López from start to finish, staying undefeated and increasing his record of 41–0–1. The fight averaged 1.04 million on Showtime. Canelo earned $2 million for the fight and López a smaller amount of $212,500.

Álvarez vs. Trout
His next fight took place on 20 April 2013, at the Alamodome in San Antonio, Texas against Austin Trout. The fight was supposed to take place during Cinco de Mayo weekend as the co-main event to Floyd Mayweather Jr. vs. Robert Guerrero; however, due to a contract disagreement between Álvarez and Mayweather regarding their potential fight on 14 September 2013, Álvarez opted to headline his own card instead.

In front of 39,247 fans, Álvarez successfully defended his WBC light middleweight title and won both the WBA (Regular) and vacant Ring light middleweight titles. During the first few rounds, Trout seemed to have a good game plan. However, Álvarez's power took over after the third round, eventually scoring a knockdown in the seventh round to give Trout the first knockdown of his career. Álvarez set up the knockdown with a pawing left jab, followed by the straight right hand. The fight was closer than expected, but Álvarez still managed to dominate Trout throughout the fight with impressive head movement and shocking power. All three judges' scorecards were in favor of Álvarez with a fair margin 115–112 from Filipino judge Rey Danseco, 116–111 from Texas' judge Oren Shellenberger, and 118–109 from South African official Stanley Christodoulou. Although the last scorecard 118–109 created controversy, the majority of sport analysts had Álvarez winning by at least two points. CompuBox stats showed that Trout was the busier fighter, landing 154 of 769 punches thrown (20%) and Álvarez was the more accurate puncher, landing 124 of his 431 thrown (29%). Immediately after the bout, Trout stated that he hadn't underestimated Álvarez but that he trained to fight a completely different fighter.

Álvarez vs. Mayweather

Álvarez, Ring magazine's #1 ranked light middleweight and the unified WBA (Regular) and WBC champion, fought against Ring magazine's #1 pound-for-pound fighter, WBA (Super) light middleweight champion, WBC and Ring magazine welterweight champion, Floyd Mayweather Jr., on 14 September 2013. Mayweather held a world title at welterweight (147 lbs), but he also still owned a light middleweight title (154 lbs), which he won by outpointing Miguel Cotto in May 2012. He was moving back up in weight to face Álvarez with their belts on the line, although the fight was contested at a catchweight of 152 lbs. The titles disputed for the bout were Álvarez's WBC and Ring light middleweight titles and Mayweather's WBA (Super) light middleweight title. On fight night, Mayweather reportedly weighed 150 lbs and Álvarez came in at 165 lbs.

In front of a sold-out crowd of 16,746 at the MGM Garden, Mayweather defeated Álvarez via majority decision. Judge C. J. Ross scored the fight 114–114, a draw. Judge Dave Moretti had it 116–112 and Craig Metcalfe scored it 117–111. Judge Ross retired after this fight. Speaking of the controversial scorecard, Mayweather said, "I can't control what the judges do." CompuBox stats showed Mayweather's dominance in the fight. He landed 232 of 505 punches (46%) while Álvarez connected on 117 of 526 thrown (22%). Mayweather earned a guaranteed $41.5 million to Álvarez's $5 million.

Catchweight

Álvarez vs. Angulo
On 9 January 2014, Golden Boy chief executive Richard Schaefer confirmed a deal had been made for a fight between Álvarez and 31 year old Mexican boxer Alfredo Angulo (22–3, 18 KOs) to take place on 8 March 2014, on Showtime PPV at the MGM Grand in Las Vegas. In March, ESPN reported the fight would take place at a catchweight of 155 lbs, due to Álvarez not being able to make the light middleweight limit of 154 lbs. For the PPV fight, Álvarez agreed to pay $100,000 of his minimum $1.25 million purse to Angulo, which would raise his purse $850,000. Also in the negotiations, Álvarez agreed to weigh no more than 168 lbs on fight night. This was Álvarez's first of five fights which took place at the 155-pound catchweight. On fight night, Álvarez weighed 174 lbs on Showtime's scale and Angulo weighed 170 lbs. In front of 14,610 at the MGM, Álvarez came out strong, throwing combinations. In a fairly lopsided beating, Álvarez scored a tenth-round stoppage over Angulo punctuated by a lead left uppercut. The end of the fight began in round six, when Angulo's left eye started swelling. When the referee waived the fight off, the crowd was displeased and booed. At the time of stoppage, two judges had it 89–82 and the third judge had it 88–83, all in favor of Álvarez.

Angulo stated post-fight how he was unhappy with the stoppage, "I told Tony he did the wrong job tonight. The referee tells us to take care of ourselves at all times. I can take care of myself. My plan was to work harder in the final four or three rounds. I had good preparation for this fight." His trainer Virgil Hunter was also unhappy with referee Tony Weeks, "I'm very upset. I told the referee and the doctor that if Canelo put two or three shots together that I would stop the fight. He landed one punch. Everyone knows Alfredo was coming on strong, everyone knows that."

Álvarez vs. Lara
Álvarez fought Erislandy Lara on 12 July 2014, at the MGM Grand in a non-title match. Lara's WBA light middleweight title was not on the line, as the fight took place at a 155-pound catchweight and both fighters weighed in at precisely 155 lbs. Álvarez rehydrated to 171 lbs while Lara came into the ring at 166 lbs. In a very close and competitive fight that went to a split decision, Álvarez came out on top with two judges scoring 115–113 in favor of each fighter and the final judge scoring 117–111 in favor of Álvarez. The final scorecard was controversial as many observers considered it far too wide. According to CompuBox, Lara landed 55 jabs to nine from Álvarez, who landed the jab at a five percent connect rate. Álvarez managed to land 88 power punches while Lara landed 53 power punches. Lara's clean punching, defense and movement were weighed against Álvarez's effective aggressiveness and power punching. Lara came out in dominant fashion, utilizing a stick-and-move style and capturing the early rounds. Although Álvarez struggled with Lara's one-two combinations, Lara's punches weren't thrown with sufficient power or frequency to dissuade him from consistently pressing the fight against a retreating Lara, and he was able to hammer away to Lara's body when he had him on the ropes. Lara's lead hand played a huge role in his one-two combination's effectiveness, but his output dropped as the fight progressed and he became increasingly tentative. Álvarez was able to cut Lara with a lead left uppercut in the seventh round. Although the decision remains controversial, any talk of a rematch in the future was dismissed by Oscar De La Hoya who went on to say, "No one wants a rematch."

Álvarez vs. Kirkland
In January 2015, Oscar De La Hoya announced that Álvarez and James Kirkland (32–1, 28 KOs) had agreed to fight each other although no date or venue was set, in a non-title light middleweight bout. The reason why the date was not set was due to the upcoming Floyd Mayweather Jr. vs. Manny Pacquiao fight not having an official date. In March, at the official press conference, the fight was announced to take place at the Minute Maid Park in Houston, Texas on 9 May 2015, live on HBO, a week after the 2 May fight between Mayweather and Pacquiao. It marked the first fight of Álvarez's lucrative HBO contract. In front of 31,588, Álvarez defeated Kirkland via third-round KO. Kirkland came out aggressively, but Álvarez wobbled him and scored a knockdown via straight right hand in round one. In the third round, a counter right uppercut sent Kirkland to the canvas. Álvarez ended the fight with a jab to the body quickly followed by the right hand, creating the KO. Álvarez landed 87 of 150 punches thrown (58%) and Kirkland landed 42 of 197 (21%). After the bout, Kirkland said, "I did not know I was knocked out." He was then taken to hospital to undergo a CT scan. The win for Álvarez set up a mega PPV fight between himself and WBC middleweight champion Miguel Cotto. The fight drew an average of 2.146 million viewers on HBO and peaked at 2.296 million, the highest viewership for HBO in 2015.

Álvarez vs. Cotto

On 21 November 2015, Álvarez won the WBC, Ring and lineal middleweight titles with a unanimous decision victory over Miguel Cotto in front of a sold-out crowd of 11,274 at the Mandalay Bay Events Center in Las Vegas. The fight took place at a catchweight of 155 lbs at Cotto's request. Although Cotto gave a tremendous effort, moving nicely throughout the fight, the judges clearly went for Álvarez's superior power and accuracy, with surprisingly wide scores of 117–111, 119–109, and 118–110. ESPN.com had the fight much closer, but still scored it in favour of Álvarez, 115–113. According to CompuBox, Álvarez landed 155 of 484 punches (32%) and Cotto landed 129 of 629 (21%), with Álvarez landing the heavier blows and inflicting more damage. Two months after the fight, the WBC awarded Álvarez the WBC Diamond middleweight title at their headquarters in Mexico.

According to HBO, the fight generated 900,000 buys on PPV, which equated to around $58 million in domestic revenue. This was the first time since 2002, that a PPV generated 900,000 which didn't include Mayweather, Pacquiao or De La Hoya. That bout was a heavyweight title fight between Lennox Lewis and Mike Tyson.

Álvarez vs. Khan

In early 2016, it was announced that British boxer Amir Khan was moving up two weight divisions to fight Álvarez at middleweight for his WBC, Ring and lineal middleweight titles. The fight took place on 7 May 2016, at the new T-Mobile Arena in Las Vegas. The bout was on HBO PPV. Khan kept his distance in the first five rounds, using his speed to come in and step out which initially caused trouble for Álvarez. In round six, Álvarez landed a devastating right hand that knocked out Khan. The fight generated a live gate of $7,417,350, according to figures released by the Nevada State Athletic Commission (NSAC). That total came from 13,072 tickets sold, far short of a sell out. The Álvarez–Khan gross places it 34th-best in Nevada history. The fight drew close to 600,000 PPV buys.

After the fight, Álvarez and his team invited middleweight champion Gennady "GGG" Golovkin into the ring to promote a future fight between them. During the post-fight interview with HBO's Max Kellerman, Álvarez stated, "Let's fight now." On 18 May 2016, Álvarez vacated the WBC title he defended in fighting Khan. The WBC immediately awarded the title to Gennady Golovkin.

Return to light middleweight

Álvarez vs. Liam Smith
On 24 June, it was announced that Álvarez was to drop the extra pound to 154 and challenge 27 year old WBO champion Liam Smith (23–0–1, 13 KOs) from England on 17 September 2016, in the main event of a card on HBO PPV. On 18 July, Golden Boy Promotions announced the bout would take place at AT&T Stadium in Arlington, Texas, after the MGM Grand in Las Vegas was the other venue looking to host the fight. Having fought his last five fights at his preferred 155-pound catchweight, Canelo said, "I am very pleased to announce my next fight against Liam Smith, a tremendous fighter with real knockout power, and the WBO light middleweight world title owner, I have no doubt that this fight will be give and take, which will fill the expectations of the fans, and I will work with all the enthusiasm as I always do to get the upper hand on Sept. 17."

In front of a record breaking crowd of 51,240, Álvarez regained a world title at light middleweight following a devastating left hook to the body in round nine. Smith was also knocked down once in round seven and once in round eight, in a fight where Álvarez was in control from the opening bell. Álvarez landed 157 punches from 422 thrown with a connect rate of 37%, compared to Smith landing 115 from 403 thrown, a connect rate of 29%. The fight drew an estimate of 300,000 PPV buys.

Golden Boy president Eric Gomez spoke to Ring magazine in December, stating that Álvarez had no immediate plans to vacate the WBO title and may fight in the first quarter of 2017 at 154, defending his world title. He also stated that there were still plans for Álvarez to fight Golovkin later in the year.

Return to catchweight

Álvarez vs. Chávez Jr.

Following Julio César Chávez Jr.'s comeback win against Dominik Britsch in December 2016, he claimed he was back and ready to fight Golovkin at 168 lbs and Álvarez at a 164-pound catchweight. Negotiations began soon after for a potential HBO PPV fight to take place in 2017 on Cinco de Mayo weekend, as there was interest from both sides that a fight take place. De La Hoya said a fight with Golovkin would still be likely for September 2017. Golden Boy president Eric Gomez confirmed a catchweight of 165 lbs was agreed between both sides. WBC president Mauricio Sulaiman was on board, saying he would likely get his organisation involved in the bout and that it was a "very attractive fight." On 18 December, Julio César Chávez Sr. spoke about the ongoing negotiations, saying Golden Boy were offering his son a small amount for the potential big PPV fight. He went on to claim his son was offered a $5 million purse with no mention he would get a cut of the PPV revenue, a counter offer was submitted. A rematch clause was also discussed, which Chávez Jr. and his team had no problem with. Chávez Sr. went on to admit that he was fully aware Álvarez is the A-side in the fight and would settle for no less than 30–35% of the full revenue.

On 22 December, the WBO made Álvarez the mandatory challenger to the middleweight title, skipping the previous number one Avtandil Khurtsidze, which was considered controversial due to Álvarez currently not fighting at middleweight. Khurtsidze, who had ten days to appeal decision, decided not to. On 24 December, Álvarez and his team gave Chávez Jr. a week to accept the terms, which included a purse of $7 million, or he would consider other options. On 12 January 2017, De La Hoya and Álvarez called for the contract to be signed, which was supposedly sent to Al Haymon, who advises Chávez Jr. and urged him to sign it. A day later, Chávez Jr. claimed he had agreed to all the demands set by Álvarez and said that he would sign the contract. According to Chávez Jr., the new demands included a weight limit set at 164.5 lbs and a $6 million base purse, plus PPV revenue percentages.

On 13 January, Álvarez officially confirmed the fight to take place on 6 May 2017. A rematch clause was also put in place if Chávez Jr. wins the fight and another clause for every pound Chávez Jr. weighs over the limit, he would be fined $1 million. On 4 February, Golden Boy Promotions announced that the fight would take place at the T-Mobile Arena in Paradise, Nevada. On 22 February, Álvarez announced that he planned on vacating his WBO light middleweight title following the Chávez Jr. fight and fighting at middleweight. On 3 March, The fight was announced a sell out on with 20,000 tickets being sold after they initially went on sale to the public on 20 February. On 11 April, Álvarez spoke to boxing reporters in a teleconference and said that he would fight as a 160-pound middleweight after the Chávez Jr. fight.

According to the NSAC, it was reported that Álvarez would earn $5 million and Chávez Jr. would earn $3 million before any shares of PPV. The figures would increase based on PPV sales.

In front of a sold-out crowd of 20,510, Álvarez won the fight in dominant fashion via a shutout unanimous decision. All three judges scored it 120–108 for Álvarez. Chávez Jr. was very cautious throughout the fight. At times, he came forward and also had Álvarez against the ropes, but failed to throw any punches. This led to jeers from the crowd in the later rounds due to a lack of action. Álvarez spoke to HBO's Max Kellerman in the post-fight interview, talking about his fighting style, "Tonight, I showed I could move, I could box, I showed as a fighter I can do all things. I thought I was going to showcase myself as a fighter that could throw punches, but he just wouldn't do it. I've shown I can do lots of things in the ring, anything a fighter brings, I've shown I can showcase myself." CompuBox stats showed that Álvarez landed 228 of 604 his punches thrown (38%) and Chávez Jr. landed 71 of 302 (24%). By the end of round five, Álvarez landed 102 punches compared to Chávez Jr.'s 25 landed. Early figures revealed that the fight generated at least one million buys. A replay was shown on regular HBO a week later and drew an average of 769,000 viewers. This was the first boxing match to generate over a million PPV buys that didn't include Mayweather, Pacquiao or De La Hoya since 2002, which saw Lennox Lewis retain his heavyweight world titles against Mike Tyson. Later sources confirmed the fight did close to 1.2 million buys, which means it would have generated around $80 million.

Middleweight

Álvarez vs. Golovkin

Immediately after the Chávez Jr. fight, Álvarez announced that he would next fight Gennady Golovkin on 16 September 2017, at a location to be determined. Golovkin, who stated he would not attend the fight, was joined by his trainer Abel Sanchez and promoter Tom Loeffler. Golovkin joined him in the ring during the announcement to help promote their upcoming bout. Speaking through a translator, Álvarez said, "Golovkin, you are next, my friend. The fight is done. I've never feared anyone, since I was 15 fighting as a professional. When I was born, fear was gone." When Golovkin arrived in the ring, he said, "I feel very excited. Right now is a different story. In September, it will be a different style – a big drama show. I'm ready. Tonight, first congrats to Canelo and his team. Right now, I think everyone is excited for September. Canelo looked very good tonight, and 100 percent he is the biggest challenge of my career. Good luck to Canelo in September."

On 9 May, Eric Gomez, president of Golden Boy Promotions told the LA Times that Álvarez had an immediate rematch clause in place on his contract, whereas Golovkin, if he loses, won't be guaranteed a rematch. De La Hoya later revealed in an interview with ESPN that the fight would also take place at the full middleweight limit of 160 lbs with no rehydration clauses, meaning Golovkin and Álvarez would be able to gain an unlimited amount of weight following the weigh in. On 5 June, the T-Mobile Arena in Las Vegas was announced as the venue of the fight and would mark the first time Golovkin would fight in the state of Nevada. The AT&T Stadium, Madison Square Garden and Dodgers Stadium missed out on hosting the fight. Eric Gomez of Golden Boy Promotions said in a statement that Álvarez would fight for the IBF title, meaning he would participate in the second day weigh in where the IBF requires that each boxer weighs no more than ten lbs over the 160-pound limit. Although he said there was no word on whether Álvarez would fight for the WBC title, Álvarez claimed that he would not be. On 7 July 2017, Golden Boy and K2 Promotions individually announced the tickets had sold out.

On 15 August, Golden Boy matchmaker Robert Diaz revealed that Álvarez would indeed attend the IBF mandatory second day weigh in and fully intended to fight for both the IBF title and the WBA title. He also made it clear that whilst Golovkin would still defend the WBC and IBO title, Álvarez would not pay their sanctioning fees. On 22 August, IBF president Daryl Peoples announced that they would be dropping the mandatory second day weigh in for unification fights, meaning neither fighter is required to participate, however they would still encourage them to do so. It was reported that Álvarez would earn a base minimum $5 million and Golovkin would earn $3 million, before any shares of the revenue are added to their purses.

On fight night, in front of a sold-out crowd of 22,358, Golovkin and Álvarez fought to a split draw (118–110 Álvarez, 115–113 Golovkin, and 114–114). ESPN's Dan Rafael and HBO's Harold Lederman scored the fight 116–112 in favor of Golovkin. Judge Adalaide Byrd's scorecard of 118–110 in favor of Álvarez was widely ridiculed. Many observers felt that Golovkin had won a narrow, closely contested fight and while a draw was justifiable, a card that wide in favor of Álvarez was inexcusable. Nevertheless, Bob Bennett, director of the Nevada Athletic Commission, said that he had full confidence in Byrd going forward. Despite the controversy, several mainstream media outlets referred to the bout as a "classic". The fight started with both boxers finding their rhythm, Álvarez using his footwork and Golovkin establishing his jab. During the middle rounds, particularly between four and eight, Álvarez started each round quickly, but seemed to tire out after a minute, with Golovkin taking over and doing enough to win the rounds. The championship rounds were arguably the best rounds and Álvarez started to counter more and both fighters stood toe-to-toe exchanging swings, the majority of which missed. The draw saw Golovkin make his 19th consecutive defense, just one behind middleweight great Bernard Hopkins. CompuBox stats showed that Golovkin was the busier of the two, landing 218 of 703 thrown (31%), while Álvarez was more accurate, landing 169 of his 505 thrown (34%). Golovkin out landed Álvarez in ten of the twelve rounds. The replay, which took place a week later on HBO averaged 726,000, peaking at 840,000 viewers.

Speaking to Max Kellerman after the fight, Golovkin said, "It was a big drama show. [The scoring] is not my fault. I put pressure on him every round. Look, I still have all the belts. I am still the champion." Álvarez felt as though he won the fight, "In the first rounds, I came out to see what he had. Then I was building from there. I think I won eight rounds. I felt that I won the fight. I think I was superior in the ring. I won at least seven or eight rounds. I was able to counterpunch and made Gennady wobble at least three times. If we fight again, it's up to the people. I feel frustrated over my draw." Golovkin's trainer Abel Sanchez believed judge Byrd had her scorecard filled out before the first bell rang. Álvarez ruled out another fight in 2017, claiming he would return on Cinco de Mayo weekend in May 2018. At the post-fight press conference, Álvarez said through a translator, "Look, right now I wanna rest. Whatever the fans want, whatever the people want and ask for, we’ll do. You know that’s my style. But right now, who knows if it’s in May or September? But one thing’s for sure – this is my era, the era of Canelo". Golovkin's promoter Tom Loeffler stated that they would like an immediate rematch, but Golovkin, who prefers fighting at least three times in a calendar year, reiterated his desire to also fight in December.

The fight surpassed Mayweather–Álvarez to achieve the third highest gate in boxing history. ESPN reported the fight generated $27,059,850 from 17,318 tickets sold. 934 complimentary tickets were given out, according to the NSAC. Mayweather vs. Álvarez sold 16,146 tickets to produce a live gate of $20,003,150.

The replay, which took place a week later on HBO averaged 726,000, peaking at 840,000 viewers. The LA Times reported the fight generated 1.3 million domestic PPV buys. Although HBO didn't make an official announcement, it is believed that the revenue would exceed $100 million.

Álvarez vs. Golovkin II

Immediately after the controversial ending, talks began for a rematch between Álvarez and Golovkin. Álvarez stated he would next fight in May 2018, whereas Golovkin was open to fighting in December 2017. ESPN reported that Álvarez, who only had the rematch clause in his contract, must activate it within three weeks of their fight. On 19 September, Golden Boy Promotions president Eric Gomez told ESPN that everyone on their side was interested in the rematch and they would hold discussions with Tom Loeffler in the coming days. Ringtv reported that the negotiations would begin on 22 September. On 24 September, Gomez said the rematch would likely take place in the first week of May 2018 or as early as March if a deal could be worked. Despite ongoing negotiations for the rematch, at the 55th annual convention in Baku, Azerbaijan on 2 October, the WBC officially ordered a rematch. Gomez reacted by telling ESPN, "Regardless of if they did or didn't order the rematch, we are going to try to make it happen. We'll do whatever it takes to make it happen." On 7 November, Gomez indicated the negotiations were going well and Álvarez would make a decision in regards to the rematch in the following weeks. It was believed that Golden Boy would wait until after David Lemieux and Billy Joe Saunders fought for the latter's WBO title on 16 December 2017, before making a decision. On 15 November, Matchroom's Eddie Hearn, promoter of Daniel Jacobs, stated that he approached Tom Loeffler regarding a possible rematch between Golovkin and Jacobs if the Álvarez–Golovkin rematch failed to take place. On 20 December, Gomez announced that the negotiations were close to being finalized after Álvarez gave Golden Boy the go-ahead to write up the contracts. On 29 January 2018, HBO finally announced the rematch would take place in May on Cinco de Mayo weekend. On 22 February, the T-Mobile Arena was again selected as the fight's venue. According to WBC president Mauricio Sulaiman, Álvarez would fight Golovkin for their title this time around.

In March 2018, Álvarez tested positive for the banned substance clenbuterol ahead of the fight. Adding to the controversy, Golovkin's trainer Abel Sanchez claimed that Álvarez had his hands wrapped in an illegal manner for the first fight. On 23 March, the NSAC temporarily suspended Álvarez due to his two positive tests for the banned substance clenbuterol. Álvarez was required to appear at a commission hearing, either in person or via telephone, on the issue on 10 April. The commission would decide at the hearing whether the fight would be permitted to go ahead as scheduled. On 28 March, MGM Resorts International, who own the T-Mobile Arena, started to offer full refunds to anyone who had already purchased tickets for the bout. They wrote, "In the event a fan requested a refund, they could get one at the original point of sale and in full." The Las Vegas Review-Journal reported the news. The hearing was rescheduled for 18 April, as Bob Bennett filed a complaint against Álvarez. On 3 April, Álvarez officially withdrew from the rematch. Golden Boy mentioned during a press conference it was hinted that Álvarez would likely not be cleared at the hearing and they would not have enough time to promote the fight.

On 13 April, an unofficial source stated that Álvarez had checked into a private hospital in Guadalajara for an arthroscopy knee surgery. A spokesperson for Golden Boy later said it was a cosmetic surgery. After surgery, Álvarez posted a picture on social media with a caption reading, "I share that today I had to undergo an arthroscopic surgery to repair the internal femoral cartilage and eliminate a pathological fold of my right knee." Eric Gomez of Golden Boy later confirmed that Álvarez had "a cyst taken out of his knee" and there were no serious issues with his knee.

At the hearing, Álvarez was given a six-month suspension, backdated to his first drug test fail on 17 February, meaning the ban would end on 17 August 2018. The Voluntary Anti-Doping Association (VADA) stated that Álvarez was not enrolled in their testing program. His promoter De La Hoya then announced that Álvarez would return to the ring on Mexican Independence Day weekend.

According to Golovkin on 27 April, before he defeated Vanes Martirosyan, a fight with Álvarez in the fall was still a priority. During a conference call, he stated it was the "biggest fight in the world" and beneficial for all parties involved. Although Golovkin stated the rematch had a ten percent chance of happening, Eric Gomez and Tom Loeffler agreed to meet and start negotiating after 5 May. One of the main issues preventing the rematch to take place was the purse split. Álvarez wanted 65–35 in his favor, the same terms Golovkin agreed to initially, however Golovkin wanted a straight 50–50 split.

On 6 June, Golovkin was stripped of his IBF title due to not adhering to the IBF's rules. The IBF granted Golovkin an exception to fight Martirosyan, although they would not sanction the fight and told Golovkin's team to start negotiating and fight mandatory challenger Sergiy Derevyanchenko by 3 August 2018. The IBF released a statement in detail explaining its decision to strip Golovkin of the belt. On 7 June, Golovkin's team stated they would accept a 55–45 split in favor of Álvarez. Five days later on 12 June, Golden Boy gave Golovkin a 24-hour deadline to accept a 57½–42½ split in Álvarez's favor or they would explore other fights. At this time, Golden Boy were already in light negotiations with Eddie Hearn for a fight against Daniel Jacobs instead. At the same time, Loeffler was working closely with Frank Warren to match Saunders with Golovkin at the end of August. Golovkin declined the offer and De La Hoya stated there would be no rematch. Despite this, some sources indicated both sides were still negotiating after a "Hail Mary" idea came to light. Hours later, De La Hoya confirmed via his Twitter account that terms had been agreed and the fight would indeed take place on 15 September at the T-Mobile Arena in Las Vegas, Nevada. Golovkin revealed to ESPN he agreed to 45%. Álvarez started training for the bout on 14 June and stated his intention to apply for his boxing license on 18 August. It was confirmed that both boxers would not physically come face to face with each other until the fight week. A split-screen press conference took place on 3 July. On 3 September, due to a majority vote of the panel, it was announced that the vacant Ring middleweight title would be contested for the bout. Doug Fischer wrote, "We posed the question to the ratings panel, which, in a landslide, voted in favor the magazine’s 160-pound championship being up for grabs when the two stars clash at T-Mobile Arena in Las Vegas."

In front of a sell out crowd of 21,965, the fight was again not without controversy as Álvarez defeated Golovkin via majority decision after twelve rounds. Álvarez was favored by judges Dave Moretti and Steve Weisfeld, both scoring the bout 115–113, the third judge Glenn Feldman scored it 114–114. The result was disputed by fans, pundits and media. Of the 18 media outlets scoring the bout, ten ruled in favor of Golovkin, seven scored a draw while one scored the bout for Álvarez. The scorecards showed how close the bout was, with the judges splitting eight rounds. After nine rounds, all three judges had their scorecards reading 87–84 for Álvarez.

The fight was much different from the first bout in terms of action. Álvarez who was described by Golovkin's team as a "runner", altered his style and became more aggressive. Both boxers found use of their respective jabs from the opening round with Golovkin using his jab more as the fight went on. Big punches were landed by both fighters during the bout, with both Álvarez and Golovkin showing excellent chins. Despite the tense build up, both boxers showed each other respect after the fight. Álvarez made good use of his body attack, landing 46 compared to Golovkin's six landed. CompuBox stats showed that Golovkin landed 234 of 879 punches thrown (27%) and Álvarez landed 202 of his 622 punches (33%). Golovkin had the edge in jabs, landing 118 out of 547 (21.6%) compared to 59 out of 256 (23%) for Álvarez. However, Álvarez had the edge in power punches, landing 143 out of 366 (39.1%) compared to 116 out of 332 (34.9%) for Golovkin. In eight of the rounds Golovkin outlanded Álvarez in total punches whereas Álvarez outlanded him in power punches in 9 of the rounds.

Álvarez stated that the fight was a "clear victory" and that "in the end, it was a victory for Mexico. And again, it was an opportunity. And I want to shout out to my opponent, the best in the sport of boxing. I am a great fighter, and I showed it tonight. If the people want another round, I'll do it again. But for right now, I will enjoy time with my family." Golovkin did not take part in the post-fight and made his way backstage where he received stitches for a cut over his right eye. He later responded to the defeat, explaining that "I'm not going to say who won tonight, because the victory belongs to Canelo, according to the judges. I thought it was a very good fight for the fans and very exciting. I thought I fought better than he did." Both fighters were open to a trilogy.

The fight generated a live gate of $23,473,500 from 16,732 tickets sold. This was lower than the first bout, but still the fourth largest-grossing gates in Nevada boxing history. The fight sold 1.1 million PPV buys, lower than the first bout; however, due to being priced at $84.95, it generated more revenue at around $94 million.

Super middleweight

Álvarez vs. Fielding
In October 2018, Álvarez announced that he would move up to the super middleweight division for the first time in his career to fight 31-year-old British boxer Rocky Fielding (27–1, 15 KOs) at Madison Square Garden in New York City, New York on 15 December 2018, for the WBA (Regular) super middleweight title. On 17 October 2018, DAZN announced that it had signed a five-year, $365 million deal with Álvarez, under which his next eleven fights would be broadcast in the U.S. by the subscription sports streaming service. The deal would begin with Álvarez vs. Fielding and replace his expired contract with HBO (which had also announced its discontinuation of boxing telecasts). Álvarez won the one-sided bout via third-round technical knockout after repeatedly downing Fielding with body shots. Following the fourth knockdown suffered by Fielding, referee Ricky Gonzalez stopped the match.

Return to middleweight

Álvarez vs. Jacobs
Álvarez defeated IBF middleweight champion Daniel Jacobs via unanimous decision, 115–113, 115–113, 116–112, on 4 May 2019, in a unification bout at the T-Mobile Arena in Las Vegas. Álvarez defended his WBA (Super), WBC, Ring and lineal middleweight titles whilst obtaining Jacobs' IBF middleweight title.

Light heavyweight

Álvarez vs. Kovalev

On 13 September 2019, Álvarez announced via social media that he would move up two weight classes to challenge WBO light heavyweight titleholder Sergey Kovalev on 2 November 2019, at the MGM Grand Garden Arena in Las Vegas. After a competitive first ten rounds in which Kovalev found success with his jab while Álvarez largely utilized power punches, the latter produced a left hook, straight right combination to stop Kovalev in the eleventh round to become a four-division world champion. At the time of the stoppage, Álvarez led 96–94 on two of the judges' scorecards, with the other scorecard even at 95–95. He joined Thomas Hearns, Sugar Ray Leonard, and Mike McCallum as the only former junior middleweight champions in history to win a title at light heavyweight. Among them, only Hearns, Leonard, and Alvarez himself established their careers at welterweight and claimed the title at the 175 pound limit.

After the fight, Kovalev suggested that he had always been unlikely to win the fight, due to the grueling schedule of back-to-back training camps which resulted from the short period of time between fighting Anthony Yarde on 24 August and Álvarez on 2 November, but he had agreed to fight the latter regardless due to the high financial incentive, reported to be $12 million. Álvarez himself was reported to have received a purse of $35 million for the fight. Álvarez responded by calling Kovalev a "bad loser".

For his 2019 campaign, Álvarez was named the fighter of the year by The Ring Magazine, ESPN, Sports Illustrated, and the Boxing Writers Association of America.

Return to super middleweight 

On 6 November 2020, Álvarez was released from his contract with Golden Boy Promotions after a lawsuit was settled for breach of contract.

Álvarez vs. Callum Smith 
On 17 November via social media, Álvarez announced he would be facing undefeated WBA (Super) and The Ring super middleweight champion Callum Smith on 19 December 2020, with the vacant WBC title also at stake. The fight was held at the Alamodome in San Antonio, Texas. Álvarez's trainer Eddy Reynoso revealed that his fighter had been sparring with undefeated heavyweight Frank Sánchez in preparation for the bout. On the night, Álvarez controlled the action over twelve rounds, inflicting Smith with a detached left biceps injury as he won by unanimous decision with scores of 119–109, 119–109, 117–111.

Álvarez vs. Yıldırım 

It was announced on 20 January 2021 that Álvarez would be defending his titles against WBC mandatory challenger Avni Yıldırım on 27 February at the Hard Rock Stadium, Miami Gardens, Florida. The bout attracted criticism due to many perceiving Yıldırım, who had not been in the ring since he lost a technical split decision to Anthony Dirrell two years prior in February 2019, to be vastly over-matched. Yıldırım had been named to the mandatory position as a result of the controversial nature of his loss to Dirrell, however, he had remained sidelined due to injury and the COVID-19 pandemic. Álvarez, who was mandated to face Yıldırım in order to retain the WBC title despite being heavily favored, was dismissive of the critics, saying "I really don’t have to give any explanation because they’re never gonna be happy with anything... He [Yıldırım] has lots of courage. He can be dangerous at any moment because he is a strong fighter."

In a one-sided fight, Álvarez defeated Yıldırım by third-round corner retirement after Yıldırım's corner threw in the towel at the end of the third round. According to CompuBox stats, Álvarez outlanded Yıldırım 67 (40%) to 11 (11%) in total punches and 58 (59%) to 4 (22%) in power punches. In the third round, Álvarez threw 53 power punches. Álvarez later stated that he had contracted COVID-19 prior to the fight and only had one month to train.

Álvarez vs. Saunders 

After Álvarez's successful defense against Avni Yıldırım, promoter Eddie Hearn confirmed Álvarez would be facing WBO titleholder and undefeated two-weight world champion Billy Joe Saunders in a unification bout on May 8 at the AT&T Stadium in Arlington, Texas. Prior to the fight, there was a dispute between the two fighters' camps regarding the size of the ring: Saunders was unhappy with the proposed 18-foot ring. He instead wanted a 24-foot ring and threatened to pull out of the fight if his request wasn't met, despite having boxed primarily in 20-foot rings in his bouts in the past in the United Kingdom. He ultimately settled for a 22-foot ring after Álvarez said, “I don’t care about the size of the ring, I’m just gonna go in there and do my job. It’s not the only excuse he’s had. He’s had plenty of excuses," referencing when Saunders had previously voiced his concerns about the selection of judges for the fight.

In front of a record breaking crowd of 73,126 for boxing attendance at an indoor facility in the United States, Álvarez won via eighth-round corner retirement when Saunders' team threw in the towel due to Saunders having suffered a fractured orbital bone as a result of an uppercut landed by Álvarez. At the time of the stoppage, Álvarez was winning on the scorecards 78–74 (twice) and 77–75. Throughout the fight, Álvarez outlanded Saunders 73 to 60 in total punches and landed 53% of his power punches.

In the immediate post-fight press conference, Álvarez was confronted by undefeated WBO middleweight champion Demetrius Andrade who asked him when they were going to fight, before accusing Álvarez of ducking him. Álvarez responded to him in English dismissively, calling him a "horrible fighter", and criticizing his resume: "Man, you fight with nobody. You are a champion but you fight with nobody." Before Andrade was removed from the press conference, Álvarez told him, "Get the fuck outta here. Please, get the fuck outta here. Get the fuck outta here because I’m gonna fuck you up right now motherfucker."

Álvarez vs. Plant 

After months of negotiations, Álvarez announced on his social media on 19 August 2021 that he would be facing undefeated IBF champion Caleb Plant on 6 November at the MGM Grand Garden Arena in Las Vegas, in an undisputed showdown for all four major world titles in the super middleweight division, with the winner set to become the first ever undisputed champion at that weight class. On 21 September 2021, the two fighters were engaged in a brief onstage scuffle during their first press conference, in which Álvarez initiated physical contact during their face-off when he shoved Plant. Álvarez stated that he had done this because he took offense to Plant's use of the word "motherfucker", interpreting it as an insult to his mother. Plant denied to reporters that he had used the common American curse word in that context. Moreover, he drew attention to Álvarez's hypocrisy, accurately indicating that Álvarez had previously used the same slur against Demetrius Andrade on the night of 8 May 2021 in the aftermath of his fight against Billy Joe Saunders in Arlington, Texas.

On fight night, Álvarez won the bout via eleventh-round technical knockout. He had knocked his opponent to the canvas with a left hook right uppercut combination in the penultimate round, before closing in to drop Plant again, prompting referee Russell Mora to call off the bout. At the time of the stoppage, Álvarez was ahead on the scorecards with 98–92, 96–94, and 97–93. With this win, he became only the sixth fighter to unify all belts in one division in the four-belt era.

Return to light heavyweight

Álvarez vs. Bivol

At the WBC Convention on 15 November 2021 in Mexico City, the WBC approved the request of Álvarez's trainer and manager, Eddy Reynoso, to have Álvarez challenge Ilunga Makabu for his WBC cruiserweight title. Álvarez has never competed at cruiserweight, so Reynoso had needed to petition the WBC to order the title fight. The cruiserweight limit was 200 pounds, but it had recently been reduced to 190 pounds by the WBC due to the introduction of bridgerweight. The fight had been rumored to take place in May 2022. This ultimately did not materialize, as Makabu was forced into a mandatory defense of his title in a rematch against Thabiso Mchunu on 29 January 2022, which the former won via split decision. Instead, it was announced on 25 February 2022 that Álvarez had signed a two-fight deal with Matchroom Boxing; the first fight would see him returning to the light heavyweight division to challenge undefeated WBA (Super) champion Dmitry Bivol on 7 May in a bout that would be televised as sports streaming service DAZN's first pay-per-view offering in the United States and Canada.

In a surprise upset, all three judges scored the bout 115–113 in Bivol's favor to hand Álvarez the second defeat of his professional career. According to CompuBox punch statistics, Bivol had outlanded Álvarez in every single round of the fight, for a total of 152 punches landed out of 710 thrown (21%), compared to Álvarez's 84 of 495 (17%). Many media reporters and pundits drew attention to the judges' official scorecards: all three judges had scored Álvarez the winner of the first four rounds, something that was roundly criticized, and described by ESPN reporter Mike Coppinger as "puzzling". Despite the widespread public opinion that Bivol was the deserved winner, Álvarez disagreed with this notion, stating in his post-fight interview: "I don't feel like I lost the fight... Personally, I felt he [Bivol] only won four or five rounds." He went on to express his desire to fight Bivol again: "We want the rematch, and we're going to do better in the rematch." Despite this, a rematch between Álvarez and Bivol did not materialize immediately, as the former opted to face WBA (Super) and IBF middleweight champion Gennady Golovkin in a trilogy bout as his opponent for his next fight instead.

Return to super middleweight

Álvarez vs. Golovkin III 

Despite Álvarez expressing his desire to avenge his loss against WBA (Super) light heavyweight champion Dmitry Bivol in a rematch, on 24 May 2022 it was announced that Álvarez would instead be returning to the super middleweight division to defend his undisputed titles against Gennady Golovkin in a trilogy bout on 17 September. The bout would see Golovkin, the WBA (Super) and IBF middleweight champion, compete in the super middleweight division for the first time in his career, while it was Álvarez's sixth bout in the same weight class.

In the first pre-fight press conference on 25 June 2022 in Los Angeles, Álvarez described the rivalry between him and Golovkin as "personal" rather than simply competitive. Álvarez stated of his opponent: “He always pretends to be a nice guy but he’s an asshole. He’s an asshole person... He's talking a lot of things about me. That's why it's personal." Álvarez went on to express his excitement at the prospect of sending his opponent into retirement, and admitted that he received gratification from making Golovkin wait four years for a trilogy bout on his own terms, in his preferred weight class of super middleweight: “It makes me feel good."

On fight night, Álvarez defeated Golovkin via unanimous decision with the scores of 115–113 (twice) and 116–112.

Álvarez vs. Ryder 
On 14 March 2023, it was announced that Álvarez would be making the second defense of his undisputed super middleweight titles against WBO interim champion John Ryder at Estadio Akron in his hometown of Guadalajara, Mexico on 6 May. The bout would mark Álvarez's first bout in his home nation in over eleven years.

Personal life
Álvarez is Catholic. He was engaged to Marisol González, who is Miss Mexico Universe 2003 and a sports reporter for Televisa Deportes. In May 2021, Álvarez married his longtime partner Fernanda Gómez in a ceremony at the Guadalajara Cathedral in Guadalajara, Mexico. He has three daughters and one son, all with different women.

Álvarez enjoys playing golf; in 2020 he stated his intentions to retire from boxing by age 37 and "dedicate himself to his business and playing golf every day" in retirement.

He is also a boxing promoter in Mexico. His company, Canelo Promotions, was established in 2010 and his business partners are his trainers, father-and-son team Chepo and Eddy Reynoso. As of 2013, Canelo Promotions represented 40 boxers throughout Mexico.

Acting career
Canelo was cast to star in Creed III.

Professional boxing record

Viewership

Pay-per-view bouts

Subscription sports streaming service bouts

See also
List of undisputed world super-middleweight boxing champions
List of world light-middleweight boxing champions
List of world middleweight boxing champions
List of world super-middleweight boxing champions
List of world light-heavyweight boxing champions
List of boxing quadruple champions
List of boxing families
List of Mexican boxing world champions

References

Video references

External links

Canelo Álvarez profile at Golden Boy Promotions

Boxers from Jalisco
Sportspeople from Guadalajara, Jalisco
World Boxing Association champions
World Boxing Council champions
Welterweight boxers
Mexican male boxers
1990 births
Living people
The Ring (magazine) champions
World Boxing Organization champions
World light-middleweight boxing champions
World middleweight boxing champions
Doping cases in boxing
Mexican sportspeople in doping cases
World super-middleweight boxing champions
International Boxing Federation champions
World light-heavyweight boxing champions